Elway may refer to:

 John Elway, a former American football player
John Elway Stadium, a stadium in California named for Elway
John Elway's Quarterback, a football-themed video game named for Elway
Jack Elway, a former American football player and coach, and father of John
Jacob Elway, a character from Dexter
Elway Research, a public-opinion firm.

See also

 
 Alway (disambiguation)
 Way (disambiguation)
 El (disambiguation)